DWWM (96.9 FM), broadcasting as 96.9 Spirit FM, is a radio station owned and operated by Abra Community Broadcasting Corporation, the media arm of the Roman Catholic Diocese of Bangued. Its studios are located at the Ground Floor, DZPA Bldg., Rizal St. cor Zamora St., Brgy. Poblacion, Bangued.

References

Catholic radio stations
Radio stations established in 1987